Humood Othman AlKhudher (Arabic: حمود عثمان الخضر; born 24 January 1989), commonly known as Humood Alkhudher, is a Kuwaiti singer and music producer.

Humood released his compilation album Fekra in 2013. In 2014, he was signed to Awakening Records and in 2015 he launched his album Aseer Ahsan. In February 2020, he announced his new album Matha Ba’d?.

Early life and education

Humood was born in Kuwait on 24 January 1989.

Career

Humood began his musical career in 1999 as a backing vocalist for his uncle who would regularly perform at local events. At age 13, he sang Ummi Filisteen, a duet with Mishari Al-Aradah on the suffering of Palestinians.

In January 2015, Humood was signed to Awakening Records and launched his debut album Aseer Ahsan on topics such as determination and self-empowerment. The album included 10 songs, one of which was "Kun Anta", that was accompanied by a music video. Aseer Ahsan reached number 10 on the Billboard World Albums Chart.

Discography

Albums
2013: sedra (in Arabic فكرة) 
2015: Aseer Ahsan (in Arabic أصير أحسن)
2020: Matha Ba’d? (in Arabic ماذا بعد)
2022: Tahayya (in Arabic)

Music videos
2016: Kun Anta (in Arabic كن أنت)
2016: Ha Anatha (in Arabic هأنذا)
2017:  Lughat Al'Aalam
(in Arabic لغات العالم)
2017: Be Curious (in Arabic (كن فضولين)
2020: Dandin Ma’i (in Arabic دندن معي)

Single
 Sharab Al-hubb (in Arabic شراب الحب)
 Tari Elfarah (in Arabic طاري الفرح)
 Heya Al jannah (in Arabic هي الجنة)
 Ahaseb nefsi (in Arabic احسب نفسي ) 
  Marhab ya Hilal (in Arabic مرحب يا هلال )
Qiyam ( in Arabic قيم)
 Ya Lail ( in Arabic يا ليل)
 Ashko Ela Allah 
Halaat Al Bent
Jammiluni (in Arabic زملوني) 
 Belquran Ehtadayt (in Arabic با القرآن اهتديت 3588)

References

External links
Awakening Records page 
YouTube channel

Kuwaiti male singers
Awakening Music artists
Living people
Rotana Records artists
1989 births